is a Japanese actress.

Filmography
 Lift (2002)
 Ju-on: The Grudge aka The Grudge (2003)
 "Slow is Beautiful" (2003)
 Suicide Manual (2003)
 Bridge: Kono hashi no mukou ni (Bridge　～この橋の向こうに～  ) (2004)
 穴～夢穴～ (2004)
 フーチャ～旋律の彼方へ～ (2004)
 Sennenbi (2004)
 Dolphins Swim (2004)
 Yogen (2004)
 二人の青春バルコニー (2004)
 Tony Takitani (2005)
 Haikyo (廃墟, lit. "ruins") (2005)
 Kamyu nante shiranai (カミュなんて知らない )(2005)
 Shounen Sasamochi (少年笹餅; lit. "youth, bamboo ricecake") (2005)
 Blue (2005)
 Love Jank! (2005)
 Kagi ga nai (鍵がない, lit. "no key") (2005)

External links 
 JMDb profile

1978 births
Japanese film actresses
Japanese television actresses
Living people
21st-century Japanese actresses